Inge Bartlog is a retired German rower who won a gold and a silver medal in the quadruple sculls at the European championships of 1966 and 1968, respectively.

References

Year of birth missing (living people)
Living people
East German female rowers
European Rowing Championships medalists